Joca Claudino (formerly Santarém) is a municipality in the state of Paraíba in the Northeast Region of Brazil.

History
On 9 November 2010 the municipality passed a law which changed its name from Santarém to Joca Claudino in honor of a local businessman.

See also
List of municipalities in Paraíba

References

Municipalities in Paraíba